The BPA Trail is a 3.6 mile trail in Federal Way, Washington.

The trail connects many of the key parts of Federal Way including Celebration Park and nearby The Commons at Federal Way Mall, the Weyerhaeuser King County Aquatic Centre, Madrona Park and the wetlands of Panther Lake Park. This trail also connects midway with the West Campus Trail, which heads to the north.

The trail is named after the Bonneville Power Administration and is built underneath the overhead electricity transmission lines built by the power administration. The trail runs behind offices in the city, providing an opportunity for leisure and commuting.

The trail is paved and suitable for bikes. The trails runs through mixed deciduous and coniferous forest.

The trail has four phases:
 Phase 1: 1-mile trail from Celebration Park to 1st Avenue
 Phase 2: 0.95-mile trail from 1st Avenue to SW Campus Drive / Aquatic Center
 Phase 3: 1.4-mile trail from SW Campus Drive to S. 356th
 Phase 4: 0.25-mile trail from S. 356th to Madrona Park Playground

References

Hiking trails in Washington (state)
Federal Way, Washington
Protected areas of King County, Washington